The 1896–97 Northern Rugby Football Union season was the second ever season of rugby league football. Following the success of the Northern Union's first season, several more clubs from the established Rugby Football Union joined the rebel competition. This resulted in the decision that for the 1896–97 season the competition should be split into two separate county championships: Lancashire and Yorkshire. This season also saw the introduction of the Challenge Cup, with Batley defeating St Helens in the inaugural final.

Season summary
Eight new teams joined the twenty-two teams already in the breakaway Northern Union, and so it was split into two county leagues for the 1896–97 season. The new teams were Bramley, Castleford, Heckmondwike, Holbeck, Leeds Parish Church, Morecambe, Swinton and Salford. Salford's first game was a 10-0 defeat away to Widnes on 5 September 1896.

Mr J.E. Warren of the Warrington club was elected as the new President of the Northern Union. Warren, previously Warrington's secretary, had played a key role in Warrington's involvement in the foundation of the Northern Union.

The leading try scorer overall this season was Hannah of Hunslet, who crossed the line 19 times. The leading goal kickers were Albert Goldthorpe of Hunslet and Sharpe of Liversedge who both successful 26 times. The leading points scorer was Archie Rigg of Halifax with 112 points.

Lancashire Senior Competition
After finishing second from the bottom of the competition in the previous season, Broughton Rangers made a remarkable turnaround to finish the 1896–97 competition at the top of the Lancashire division, just one competition point ahead of Oldham, who had won more matches and had a better points differential. Although participating in the Lancashire Senior Competition, Runcorn and Stockport were from Cheshire.

Source: R.L.Yearbook 1995–96 cited in "The Vault".

League points: for win = 2; for draw = 1; for loss = 0.
Pld = Games played; W = Wins; D = Draws; L = Losses; PF = Match points scored; PA = Match points conceded; PD = Points difference; Pts = League points.

Yorkshire Senior Competition
The previous season's champions, Manningham continued their good form in the Northern Union's second season, finishing in second place. However Brighouse took the Yorkshire championship with one win more than Manningham.

Source: R.L.Yearbook 1995–96 cited in "The Vault".

League points: for win = 2; for draw = 1; for loss = 0.
Pld = Games played; W = Wins; D = Draws; L = Losses; PF = Match points scored; PA = Match points conceded; PD = Points difference; Pts = League points.

References

External links
1896–97 Northern Rugby Football Union season at wigan.rlfans.com
The First Challenge Cup final at rlhalloffame.org.uk
Manningham's second season at bantamspast.co.uk
Rugby League History at rlheritage.co.uk
The Northern Union at warringtonwolves.org

1896 in English rugby league
1897 in English rugby league
Northern Rugby Football Union seasons